Statistics of Swedish football Division 2 for the 1965 season.

League standings

Norrland

Svealand

Västra Götaland

Östra Götaland

Allsvenskan promotion playoffs

Footnotes

References 

Swedish Football Division 2 seasons
2
Sweden
Sweden